Hamilton-Wenham Regional High School (HWRHS) is a public high school in South Hamilton, Massachusetts, United States. It is the only high school in the Hamilton-Wenham Regional School District, which has its administrative offices in Wenham, Massachusetts. The high school serves the towns of Hamilton, and Wenham.

Notable alumni
 Michael Carter-Williams - National Basketball Association (NBA) player
 John Ryan Pike - Musician and founding member of Ra Ra Riot
 David McWane - Musician and founding member of Big D and the Kids Table
 David Morse - Actor

References

External links

Cape Ann League
Educational institutions established in 1962
Schools in Essex County, Massachusetts
Public high schools in Massachusetts
Buildings and structures in Hamilton, Massachusetts
Wenham, Massachusetts
1962 establishments in Massachusetts